Bam (also Romanized as Bām) is a village in Bam Rural District, Bam and Safiabad District, Esfarayen County, North Khorasan Province, Iran. At the 2006 census, its population was 1,474, in 481 families.

In 2022, A routine road construction project has led to the accidental discovery of an extensive network of underground corridors in Bam village. Archaeologists have linked the discovery to the nearby fortress of Shahr-e Belqeys (City of Belqeys). Shahr-e Belqeys was prosperous during a period from the late Sassanid era to early Islamic times. The total length of those corridors is 18 km, and there is a bathroom and a mill on the way, which has not been opened yet.

References 

Populated places in Esfarayen County